Romance of a Rogue is a 1928 American silent drama film directed by King Baggot and starring H.B. Warner, Anita Stewart, and Charles K. Gerrard. It is based on the 1923 novel by the British writer Ruby M. Ayres.

Cast
 H.B. Warner as Bruce Lowry 
 Anita Stewart as Charmain 
 Alfred Fisher as John Cristopher 
 Charles K. Gerrard as Leonard Hardingham
 Fred Esmelton
 Billy Franey

References

Bibliography
 Donald W. McCaffrey & Christopher P. Jacobs. Guide to the Silent Years of American Cinema. Greenwood Publishing, 1999.

External links
 

1928 films
1928 drama films
1920s English-language films
American silent feature films
Silent American drama films
Films directed by King Baggot
American black-and-white films
Films set in England
Films based on British novels
1920s American films